Mzuzu Bible College is a private college located in Mzuzu, Malawi.  It is affiliated with the Churches of Christ.

External links

Universities and colleges in Malawi
Universities and colleges affiliated with the Churches of Christ